Baby Mine may refer to:

Arts and entertainment

Films and plays
 Baby Mine (play), a 1910 Broadway play by Margaret Mayo
 Baby Mine (1917 film), based on the 1910 play
 Baby Mine (1928 film), remake of the 1917 film

Music
 "Baby Mine", a popular song published in 1901
 "Baby Mine" (song), a song from the 1941 Disney film Dumbo and also in the 2019 Tim Burton remake
 "Baby Mine", a version of traditional blues song "Crawdad Song" from the 1963 album Bill Henderson with the Oscar Peterson Trio
 "Baby Mine", a 1966 R&B/Soul song by Thelma Houston

Publications
 Baby Mine (comic strip), syndicated comic strip (1930–1939)
 Baby Mine, a 1992 novel by Erica Spindler

Other uses
 Baby Mine (steamboat) of the Hunt Brothers steamboat line
 Baby Mine, also known as Pocahontas Exhibition Coal Mine (declared a National Historic Landmark in 1994)

See also
 "(Oh Baby Mine) I Get So Lonely", a 1953 song written by Pat Ballard
 Baby Be Mine (disambiguation)